Bhouji is a Bhojpuri film released in 1965 and directed by Kundan Kumar.

References

External links

1965 films
1960s Bhojpuri-language films
1960s Indian films